Ennahar TV is an Arabic language satellite television channel broadcasting from Bir Mourad Rais. Ennahar TV was set up by Groupe Ennahar and a number of Arab intellectuals from Algeria and the Arab World.

History
Ennahar TV started broadcasting in test mode on 6 March 2012 satellite (Nilesat), since the capital jordanaise Amman. It opened its programming by broadcasting the first news by the duo Riyadh Benamar and Nour El Yakin Meghriche.

In April 2013, the Ministry of Communication confirmed the granting of approval to Ennahar TV, next to Echourouk TV and El Djazairia. This administrative authorization is provisional, valid until 31 December 2013.

On 5 July 2013, Ennahar Documentaries, a sister channel of Ennahar TV, was launched on Nilesat. The latter continuously broadcast reports and documentaries from the Ennahar TV catalog. This system was stopped a few days after its launch.

In 2014, the chain was controversial when it broadcast a report on university residences for girls in Algeria. The chain has been often accused of sensationalism.

On 28 November 2014 was launched Zahra DZ (now known as Ennahar Laki), a chain of Ennahar group dedicated to women in Algeria. This channel broadcast soap operas Arabic or Turkish dubbed in Arab but also rebroadcast some magazines mother string as Nahar.com or Mag-Zoom.

In April 2015, the president of the audiovisual regulatory authority (ARAV), Miloud Chorfi Ennahar TV began a series of meetings with various stakeholders, including with Anis Rahmani, general manager of Ennahar group.

On 2 June 2015, at the 9th edition of the Media Star, Ibtissam Bouslama, a journalist of Ennahar TV won the second prize in the category "audiovisual production" for ithets report entitled "Cybercrime" which was broadcast by the antenna of the chain.

In December 2015, Ennahar TV was called to order by ARAV for broadcasting a report that presented the general secretary Workers Party, Louisa Hanoune, as a woman who "encourages corruption." Miloud Chorfi, director of ARAV, summoned the head of the string editor for contacting him warning.

On 24 January 2016, throughout the morning until 11 o'clock, Ennahar TV displayed a black screen. According to a news channel published on its website, there was a technical failure due to a cutting of a fiber optic cable in Egypt at 6:50, which also affected several other channels.

On 6 March 2016, the headquarters of Ennahar TV Algiers was renamed in the name of the deceased Mujahid Moukkadem Ben Slimane. This renaming was accompanied by a ceremony attended by the widow of the mujahid, the Minister of Mujahideen Tayeb Zitouni and the President of the National Front for Social Justice Khaled Bounedjma.

Programming

News bulletins

Current affairs

Other shows 
 Zapping YouTube

On air staff 
 Haroun Nemoul

References

External links
 

Arab mass media
Television in Algeria
Arabic-language television stations
Arabic-language television
Television channels and stations established in 2012
Television stations in Algeria
2012 establishments in Algeria